Pascula rufonotata is a species of sea snail, a marine gastropod mollusk in the family Muricidae, the murex snails or rock snails.

Description

Distribution

References

Pascula
Gastropods described in 1864
Taxa named by Philip Pearsall Carpenter